The Bay of Islands is an area in New Zealand, and:
 Bay of Islands (New Zealand electorate), a former New Zealand electorate

Bay of Islands may also refer to:

 Bay of Islands, Newfoundland and Labrador, Canada
 Bay of Islands (electoral district), a provincial electoral district for the House of Assembly of Newfoundland and Labrador
 Bay of Islands Coastal Park, a coastal reserve in Victoria, Australia

See also
 Bay Islands (disambiguation)
 Island Bay, Wellington
 Bay of Isles